The Manfred Lautenschläger-Stiftung (Manfred Lautenschläger Foundation), founded in 2002, is a charitable foundation based in Heidelberg, Germany. The foundation supports science, research, education, art, culture, the understanding between peoples, as well as regional projects.

Programs and awards
Among other activities, awards and stipends, the Laugenschläger Foundation sponsors the Lautenschläger Research Prize, with a prize money of EUR 250.000, at the University of Heidelberg.

References

External links
Webpages of the Manfred Lautenschläger-Stiftung

Foundations based in Germany